Cephalomappa is a genus of plant of the family Euphorbiaceae first described as a genus in 1874. It is native to Malaysia, Borneo, and Sumatra.

Species
 Cephalomappa beccariana Baill. - Sarawak
 Cephalomappa lepidotula Airy Shaw - Malaysia, Borneo, Sumatra
 Cephalomappa malloticarpa J.J.Sm. - Malaysia, Borneo, Sumatra
 Cephalomappa paludicola Airy Shaw - Sarawak
 Cephalomappa penangensis Ridl. - Peninsular Malaysia

formerly included
moved to Muricococcum
Cephalomappa sinensis  (Chun & F.C.How) Kosterm., synonym of Muricococcum sinense Chun & F.C.How

References

Epiprineae
Flora of Malesia
Euphorbiaceae genera
Taxa named by Henri Ernest Baillon